The 2016–17 Lafayette Leopards men's basketball team represented Lafayette College during the 2016–17 NCAA Division I men's basketball season. The Leopards, led by 22nd-year head coach Fran O'Hanlon, played their home games at the Kirby Sports Center in Easton, Pennsylvania as members of the Patriot League. They finished the season 9–21, 5–13 in Patriot League play to finish in a tie for ninth place. As the No. 10 seed in the Patriot League tournament, they lost in the first round to Loyola (MD).

Previous season
The Leopards finished the 2015–16 season 6–24, 3–15 in Patriot League play to finish in last place. They lost to Navy in the first round of the Patriot League tournament.

Offseason

Departures

2016 recruiting class

2017 recruiting class

Roster

Schedule and results

|-
!colspan=9 style=| Non-conference regular season

|-
!colspan=9 style=| Patriot League regular season

|-
!colspan=9 style=| Patriot League tournament

See also
2016–17 Lafayette Leopards women's basketball team

References

Lafayette Leopards men's basketball seasons
Lafayette
Lafayette
Lafayette